British Rail Class D3/14 was a diesel-electric locomotive built by the London and North Eastern Railway at its Doncaster Works. It had a Petter engine, and Brush Traction electricals. It was absorbed by British Railways on nationalisation, but was withdrawn in the pre-TOPS era.

History 
Originally laid down as a D3/9, the frames were moved from Doncaster Works to Brush Traction's Falcon Works in Loughborough for final assembly. It was completed in September 1947 and undertook trials with LNER in November 1947. In January 1948, it was moved to Temple Mills Yard in London for further trials. It was then moved to March Whitemoor Yard. In December 1948, it was returned to Loughborough and was acquired by British Rail upon nationalisation.

In April 1949, it was delivered to March shed. Whilst based at March, it was used on short freight services between Ferme Park and Herne Hill. It moved to Hornsey Depot in December 1951, however it was moved to Crewe Works later that month. It returned to March in January 1952 and returned to Hornsey in around 1955. In January 1957, it worked at Woodford Hase Shed and New England Shed in Peterborough where it remained until withdrawal in October 1962.

Upon withdrawal, it was moved to Doncaster Works, and was finally scrapped in July 1963.

See also

 British Rail 15107
 List of British Rail classes

Sources

 
 
 

DES2
D003.14
Brush Traction locomotives
C locomotives
Individual locomotives of Great Britain
Railway locomotives introduced in 1947
Scrapped locomotives
Unique locomotives
Standard gauge locomotives of Great Britain
Diesel-electric locomotives of Great Britain